

References
 

Perception